The 4th Reserve Officers' Training Corps Brigade is a United States Army Reserve Officers' Training Corps brigade based in Fort Bragg, North Carolina.

Battalions

Delaware 
 University of Delaware

District of Columbia 
 Georgetown University
 Howard University

Maryland 
 Bowie State University
 Loyola College
 McDaniel College
 Morgan State University
 Johns Hopkins University
 University of Maryland at College Park

North Carolina 
 Appalachian State University
 Campbell University
 Duke University
 East Carolina University
 Elizabeth City State University
 Fayetteville State University
 North Carolina A&T State University
 North Carolina State University
 Saint Augustine's College
 University of North Carolina at Chapel Hill
 University of North Carolina at Charlotte
 Wake Forest University

South Carolina 
 Clemson University
 Furman University
 Presbyterian College
 South Carolina State University
 University of South Carolina
 Wofford College

Virginia 
 College of William and Mary
 George Mason University
 Hampton University
 James Madison University
 Norfolk State University
 Old Dominion University
 Regent University
 University of Richmond
 University of Virginia
 Virginia State University

West Virginia 
 Marshall University
 West Virginia State University
 West Virginia University

References

Reserve Officers' Training Corps